The Big Bluff is a 1933 German comedy film directed by Georg Jacoby and starring Lee Parry, Betty Amann, and Harald Paulsen. It was shot at the EFA Studios in Berlin. The film's sets were designed by the art director Erich Czerwonski.

Cast
Lee Parry as Gisa Langer
Betty Amann as Marion Millner
Harald Paulsen as Harry Neuhoff
Otto Wallburg as Otto Pitt, Generaldirektor
Paul Hörbiger as Arthur Richman
Adele Sandrock as Frau Timm
Hugo Fischer-Köppe as Kommissar Keller
Walter Steinbeck as Der Kriminalrat
Theo Lingen as Der Pressechef
Sigurd Lohde as Der Regisseur
Gerti Ober as Die Zofe
Fred Immler as Paul, der Komplize
Alfred Beierle as Kriminalbeamter Kube
Adolf E. Licho as Paradieser
Ellen Blarr as Eine Sekretärin
Gerhard Dammann as Ein Klavierspieler
Nini Theilade as Eine Tänzerin

References

Bibliography 
 Klaus, Ulrich J. Deutsche Tonfilme: Jahrgang 1933. Klaus-Archiv, 1988.

External links

Films of the Weimar Republic
German comedy films
1933 comedy films
Films directed by Georg Jacoby
German multilingual films
Tobis Film films
German black-and-white films
1930s German films
Films shot at Halensee Studios